The Artibonite Group is a geologic group in Haiti. It preserves fossils dating all the way back to the Middle to Late Miocene period.

See also 

 List of fossiliferous stratigraphic units in Haiti

References

Further reading 
 J. Butterlin. 1960. Géologie générale et régionale de la République D'Haiti. Travaux et Mémoires de L'Institute des Hautes Estudes de L'Amérique Latine 6

Geologic formations of the Caribbean
Geologic groups of North America
Geology of Haiti
Neogene Caribbean